Daniel Londoño (born 1 January 1995) is a Colombian professional footballer who plays as defender for Atlético Huila.

Honours 
Atlético Nacional
 Superliga Colombiana (1): 2016

External links 
 

1995 births
Living people
Colombian footballers
Colombia under-20 international footballers
Categoría Primera A players
Envigado F.C. players
Atlético Nacional footballers
Atlético Huila footballers
Association football defenders
People from Itagüí
Sportspeople from Antioquia Department